Songbook Volume II is an album by American saxophonist and composer Benny Carter, released in 1997 by MusicMasters Records.

Reception

AllMusic reviewer Ken Dryden stated, "The 1997 release of this CD helped Benny Carter celebrate his 90th birthday, featuring 14 of his original ballads by a dozen guests, in addition to a warm tribute to his wife of many years, 'When Hilma Smiles,' sung by Carter himself in a friendly, unpretentious manner. His smooth alto sax hasn't lost anything over the decades, and the top-notch cornet of Warren Vaché is also a nice touch".

Track listing
All compositions by Benny Carter, except where noted.
 "My Mind Is Still On You" (Benny Carter, John Moen, Leonard Feather) – 3:22
 "Echo of My Dream" – 5:07
 "Rock Me to Sleep" (Carter, Paul Vandervoort II) – 5:58
 "Stop Me Before I Fall in Love Again" – 4:01
 "He Doesn't Need Me Now" (Carter, Vandervoort) – 8:31
 "Doozy" – 6:02
 "Nevermore" – 5:07
 "Malibu" – 7:04
 "Blue Moonlight" – 5:50
 "Evening Star" – 5:27
 "Slow Carousel" – 4:44
 "Whisper to One" (Carter, Al Stillman) – 4:02
 "I'm the Caring Kind" (Carter, Irving Gordon) – 5:52
 "When Hilma Smiles" – 4:15
Recorded at Group IV Studios, Hollywood, CA on July 26, 27, and 28, 1995 (tracks 1-3 & 8-10) and at Master Sound Astoria, Astoria, NY, on June 26, 27, & 28, 1995 (tracks 4-7 & 11-14)

Personnel
Benny Carter – alto saxophone, vocals
Warren Vaché – cornet (tracks 1-11 & 13)
Chris Neville – piano 
Steve LaSpina – bass (tracks 1-13)
Sherman Ferguson – drums (tracks 1, 2, 4-9 & 11-13)

Guests
Joe Williams (track 1), Diana Krall (track 2), Ruth Brown (track 3), Billy Stritch (tracks 4 & 7), Nancy Marano (tracks 5 & 11), Jon Hendricks (track 6), Lainie Kazan (track 8), Marlena Shaw (track 9), Kenny Rankin (track 10), Barbara Lea (track 12), Weslia Whitfield (track 13) – vocals
Roy McCurdy – drums (tracks 3 & 10)

References

1997 albums
Benny Carter albums
MusicMasters Records albums